Minhag Ashkenaz is the minhag of the Ashkenazi German Jews. Minhag Ashkenaz was common in Germany, Austria, the Czech lands, and elsewhere in Western Europe, in contrast to the Minhag Polin of the Eastern European Ashkenazi Jews.

Minhag Ashkenaz and Minhag Polin

The term "Minhag Ashkenaz", strictly applied, refers only to the minhag of German Jews south and west of the Elbe, most notably the community of Frankfurt am Main. Jews in Germany were historically divided into the "Bayers" of Bavaria and southern Germany, who followed the Minhag Ashkenaz, and the "Polanders" in northern Germany who followed Minhag Polin.

History 
Following Kristallnacht, a number of German Jews (Yekkes) escaped Frankfurt, relocating to the Washington Heights neighborhood of New York City, where they still have a synagogue, Khal Adath Jeshurun (KAJ), which punctiliously adheres to the Yekkish liturgical text, rituals, and melodies. Unlike most Ashkenazic synagogues in the United States, which follow the Eastern Ashkenazic (Poilisher) liturgical rite, KAJ follows the Western Ashkenazic rite (Minhag Ashkenaz), in its liturgical text, practices, and melodies. They use the Rödelheim Siddur Sfas Emes (see: Wolf Heidenheim), though the congregation's nusach varies in some places from Rödelheim.

Communities using Minhag Ashkenaz
List of communities, synagogues, and minyanim following Minhag Ashkenaz:

Yeshivas Frankfurt - Frankfurt, Germany
Yeshivas Frankfurt, Beis Yisrael Neighborhood - Jerusalem
Yeshurun, Beis haKnesses kMinhog Ashkenaz - Bnei Brak, Israel
K'hal Adas Yisroel - Bnei Brak, Israel
K'hal Adas Yeshurun - Jerusalem
Ashkenaz Minyan in Bayit Vegan - Jerusalem
K'hal Kaudesh Minhog Ovaus - Talbiya, Jerusalem
K'hal Adas Yeshurun - Beitar Illit, West Bank
Beis Knesses k'Minhag Ashkenaz - Haifa, Israel
Minyan k'Minhag Ashkenaz - Rekhasim, Israel
K'hal Adas Yeshurun of Beit Shemesh - Beit Shemesh, Israel
Kehillas Ashkenaz, Kiryat Sefer - Modi'in Illit, West Bank
Kehillas Ashkenaz of Baltimore - Baltimore, Maryland
Minhag Ashkenaz Minyan - Chicago, Illinois
Ashkenaz Minyan in Wavecrest/Bayswater - Bayswater/Far Rockaway, New York
Ashkenaz Minyan in Brooklyn - New York City
Passaic-Clifton Ashkenaz - Passaic, New Jersey
Ohel Moshe, Manchester - Manchester, England

See also
History of the Jews in Germany
Minhag
Nusach Ashkenaz
Yekke

References

External links
Shorshei Minhag Ashkenaz, Machon Moreshes Ashkenaz - The Institute for German Jewish Heritage

Ashkenazi Jewish culture in Austria
Ashkenazi Jewish culture in Germany
Ashkenazi Jewish culture in Switzerland
Ashkenazi Jewish culture in the Czech Republic
German-Jewish culture in the United States
Judaism in Austria
Judaism in Germany
Judaism in Switzerland
Judaism in the Czech Republic
Minhagim
Yekke